"Beware of the Dog" is a 1944 World War II story by Roald Dahl which was originally published in Harper's Magazine and later appeared in his Over to You collection.  Its basic plot was adapted into the 1965 movie 36 Hours, starring James Garner and Rod Taylor, and the TV movie Breaking Point in 1989.

Story 
RAF pilot Peter Williamson sustains a serious injury (the loss of a leg from a cannon shell) while flying a mission over German-controlled Vichy France. He bails out of his plane and later awakes to find himself in a hospital bed in Brighton, on the English coast. As he recovers, strange things keep happening, such as hearing the sound of German warplanes through the window when none would have been nearby. The nurse also mentions that the hospital water is very hard, when Williamson knows the water in Brighton is famous for being soft.

Suspicious and frightened, Williamson drags himself to the window and sees a wooden sign, "GARDE AU CHIEN" (French for “Beware of the Dog”). He now knows that he is actually in Vichy France, and that the English caregivers are Germans in disguise. When they send in a fake RAF commander to convince him to divulge his squadron's location, he stares him straight in the eye and says nothing more than "My name is Peter Williamson. My rank is Squadron Leader and my number is nine, seven, two, four, five, seven."

References

1944 short stories
Prisoners of war in popular culture
Short stories adapted into films
Short stories by Roald Dahl
Works originally published in Harper's Magazine
World War II short stories